Petrina may refer to:

 Petrina, Arcadia, a village in Arcadia, Greece
 Petrina, Laconia, a village in the Sminos municipal unit, Laconia, Greece
 Petrina, Kostel, a village near Kostel
 Petrina (surname)
Petrina (given name)